12 Songs is the twenty-sixth studio album by Neil Diamond, released in 2005. It was his first studio album since 2001's Three Chord Opera. It was produced by Rick Rubin.

The working title for the album was self-titled. The original pressing of the album was copy-protected using Sony's controversial XCP technology.

Album history
Initial work on the album began after Diamond had concluded his tour behind Three Chord Opera in 2002. Retreating to his Colorado cabin, Diamond found himself temporarily snowed in, and started to pass the time away by working on new material.

Not long afterward, Diamond met Rick Rubin. Rubin expressed interest in working with Diamond, and the two got together several times at each other's homes before ever going into the recording studio.

Rubin, using the artist's Bang and early Uni albums as a springboard, encouraged Diamond to keep writing material over the course of a year. Once the two collaborators had plenty of material at their disposal that they felt strongly about, Rubin put together some of the same musicians he had used for Johnny Cash's American Recordings releases, including Tom Petty sidemen Mike Campbell and Benmont Tench, and encouraged Diamond to play guitar himself in the studio. The sessions were also the last ever performance by organ player Billy Preston, who died in June 2006.

The end result, 12 Songs, ended up being one of Diamond's most successful and critically acclaimed studio albums in years, debuting at #4 on the Billboard 200 album chart. Rubin's influence would extend beyond the recording sessions, as the subsequent tour behind the album found Diamond using tougher-sounding arrangements of his classic songs with his longtime backing band, and playing more guitar onstage than he had done since the Hot August Night era.

Extended copy protection

In November 2005, it was revealed that Sony BMG was distributing albums with Extended Copy Protection or XCP, a controversial feature that automatically installed rootkit software on any Microsoft Windows machine upon insertion of the disc.  In addition to preventing the CD's contents from being copied, it was also revealed that the software reported the users' listening habits back to Sony and also exposed the computer to malicious attacks that exploited insecure features of the rootkit software. Though Sony refused to release a list of the affected CDs, the Electronic Frontier Foundation identified 12 Songs as one of the discs with the invasive software.

Rubin says that he and Diamond were not aware of XCP, and Rubin provided this explanation to The New York Times:

By December 2005, Sony BMG had remastered and repressed 12 Songs and all other albums released with the XCP software as standard, non-copy-protected CDs.

Track listing
All songs written by Neil Diamond.
 "Oh Mary" - 5:12
 "Hell Yeah" - 4:25
 "Captain of a Shipwreck" - 3:55
 "Evermore" - 5:18
 "Save Me a Saturday Night" - 3:31
 "Delirious Love" - 3:12
 "I'm on to You" - 4:27
 "What's It Gonna Be" - 4:04
 "Man of God" - 4:21
 "Create Me" - 4:10
 "Face Me" - 3:27
 "We" - 3:49
 "Men Are So Easy" (bonus track on special edition) - 4:04
 "Delirious Love" (featuring Brian Wilson) (bonus track on special edition) - 3:23

Personnel
 Neil Diamond – vocals, guitar
 Mike Campbell – guitar, horn and string arrangements, conductor
 Smokey Hormel, Pat McLaughlin, Jason Sinay – guitar
 Jonny Polonsky – guitar, bass guitar
 Lenny Castro – percussion
 Benmont Tench – piano, Hammond organ
 Larry Knechtel, Roger Joseph Manning Jr. – piano
 Patrick Warren – Chamberlin
 Billy Preston – Hammond organ (4, 9, 11)
 Jimmie Haskell – horn and string arrangements (4)
 Brian Wilson – vocals (14)

Production
 Producer – Rick Rubin
 Recorded by Greg Fidelman, Jason Lader and Andrew Scheps.
 Additional Recording – Mark Linette
 Assistant Engineers – Greg Burns, Chris Holmes, Pete Martinez, Jim Monti, Dana Nielsen and Erich Talaba.
 Mixed by Greg Fidelman
 Recorded and Mixed at Arch Angel Studios (Los Angeles, CA).
 Additional Recording at Ocean Way Recording, The Sound Factory and Akademie Mathematique of Philosophical Sound (Los Angeles, CA); Sound City Studios (Van Nuys, CA).
 Mastered by Vlado Meller at Sony Mastering (New York City, NY).
 Art Direction and Design – Reina Katzenberger
 Photography – Martin Atkins

Charts

Weekly charts

Year-end charts

Certifications

References

External links
 Are You Affected By Sony-BMG's Rootkit? (November 9, 2005) from Electronic Frontier Foundation

Albums produced by Rick Rubin
Neil Diamond albums
2005 albums
Columbia Records albums
Albums recorded at United Western Recorders
Albums recorded at Sound City Studios